Taborian Hospital in  Mound Bayou, Mississippi opened in 1942 to great fanfare by the International Order of Twelve Knights and Daughters of Tabor. Everyone on the staff, including doctors and nurses, were black. The facilities included two major operating rooms, an x-ray machine, incubators, electrocardiograph, blood bank, and laboratory.  Operating costs came almost entirely from membership dues and other voluntary contributions.

The first chief surgeon of the hospital was T. R. M. Howard, who later became an important civil rights leader in Mississippi and mentor to both Medgar Evers and Fannie Lou Hamer, who was often a patient at the hospital.

After years of financial pressure, the hospital lost its fraternal status in 1967 when the federal government took it over and put it under the authority of the Office of Economic Opportunity.  The hospital, renamed as the Mound Bayou Community Hospital, finally closed in 1983.

During the 1990s, the Knights and Daughters of Tabor began a continuing campaign to renovate the original hospital building which has been empty for many years.

In 2011, work began to restore the hospital and create a regional medical center.  When completed, half of the building will serve as an urgent care facility, which will utilize telemedicine in collaboration with the University of Mississippi Medical Center.  During construction, effort will be placed on maintaining the historic integrity of the building.

Notes

References
 Beito, David T. (2000). From Mutual Aid to the Welfare State: Fraternal Societies and Social Services, 1890–1967. University of North Carolina Press. 

Hospital buildings completed in 1942
Mississippi Landmarks
Hospital buildings on the National Register of Historic Places in Mississippi
International Order of Twelve Knights and Daughters of Tabor
National Register of Historic Places in Bolivar County, Mississippi
Voluntary hospitals
Historically black hospitals in the United States
African-American history of Mississippi
Hospitals established in 1942
Mound Bayou, Mississippi